Isidro del Carmen Solís Palma (born 30 March 1954) is a Chilean politician and lawyer who served as Minister of Justice during the first government of Michelle Bachelet (2014–2018).

References

External links
 Prolife at SolisAbogados

1963 births
Living people
Chilean people
University of Chile alumni
University of Concepción alumni
Chilean politicians
20th-century Chilean politicians
21st-century Chilean politicians
Radical Party of Chile politicians
Radical Social Democratic Party of Chile politicians
Chilean Freemasons